Corporal Edward Brown Jr. (July 6, 1841 – November 5, 1911) was an Irish soldier who fought in the American Civil War. Brown received the United States' highest award for bravery during combat, the Medal of Honor, for his action during the Second Battle of Fredericksburg and at Salem Heights, Virginia between May 3 and 4, 1863. He was honored with the award on 24 November 1880.

Biography
Brown was born in Ireland on 6 July 1841. He joined the 62nd New York Infantry in August 1861, and mustered out in September 1864. Brown died on 5 November 1911 and his remains are interred at the Calvary Cemetery in New York.

Medal of Honor citation

See also

List of American Civil War Medal of Honor recipients: A–F

References

1841 births
1911 deaths
Irish-born Medal of Honor recipients
People of New York (state) in the American Civil War
Union Army officers
United States Army Medal of Honor recipients
American Civil War recipients of the Medal of Honor